The Psychédélices Tour began in 2008. Alizée promoted her album with the tour which was highly focused in Mexico, being one of the countries where Alizée has experienced most of her success. On 2008, she appeared in one performance in Russia and five in Mexico. The performance in Paris, France, on Le Grand Rex was cancelled, making this the only tour by Alizée that had no venues in France. She returned to Mexico in 2009 for one concert for San Marcos Fair, where she appeared as an international guest. The follow up concert was not part of the actual tour and had only a partial song list performed.

Background and development
In March 2008, Alizée visited Mexico for the first time on a short promotional tour. On 5 March she was supposed to hold the second-ever public autograph session of her career but it was cancelled due to problems with the store's security. Alizée held an improvised press conference to apologise to all her Mexican fans and to explain that it was not her fault. Sony BMG Mexico also released a statement saying it was not Alizée's fault, that it was the store who had problems with the security, and that they did not expect so many people in attendance; fences had been broken and children were in danger. Alizée also promised to make amends by having another autograph session when she returned to the country on the following tour. She also stated that her tour would start on 18 May in Moscow, followed by concerts in Mexico and then France. She also commented that piracy in music has two sides "one good" and "one bad" saying that sometimes it's good because her music reaches places that she never thought to reach. After the success of Alizée's tour in Mexico and in an attempt to amend the damage caused during her first promotional visit, Alizée announced an autograph session with fans on 26 June 2008 in Mexico City, over 300 CDs were signed and the record label executives of Sony BMG Mexico presented a Gold certification for shipments over 50,000 copies of Psychédélices – Tour Edition. A new cover singing in Mexico was Madonna's cover, "La Isla Bonita"; it has gone on to become Alizée's first top ten on the airplay chart.

Following the success of Alizée En Concert and Psychédélices in Mexico, Alizée's former music label, Universal Music released a compilation album, titled Tout Alizée. The compilation, which is a Mexico-only release, consists of 15 tracks (with 4 remixes) from her first two studio albums. It is augmented with a bonus DVD featuring some of her music videos. The compilation debuted to #62 on the Mexican Top 100 Albums Chart and #20 on the Mexican International Top 20 Albums Chart.

Setlist

Russia
"Lilly Town
"Fifty-Sixty
"Mon Taxi Driver
"Idealiser
"Par les Paupières
"Moi... Lolita
"Hey! Amigo!
"Jamais Plus
"J'en ai marre!
"The Sound of Silence
"L'Effet
"Amélie m'a dit
"Lonely List
"L'Alizé
"99 Luftballons
"J'ai pas vingt ans
"Décollage
"Mademoiselle Juliette
"Psychédélices
Reprise
"Fifty-Sixty

Mexico
"Lilly Town
"Mademoiselle Juliette
"Mon Taxi Driver
"J'en ai marre!
"Jamais Plus
"Moi... Lolita
"Par Les Paupières
"Fifty-Sixty
"Lonely List
"J'ai pas vingt ans
"The Sound of Silence
"L'Effet
"La Isla Bonita
"Hey! Amigo!
"Décollage
"Psychédélices
Reprise
"J'en ai marre!

Concerts

Cancelled Concerts

References

External links
Official website

2007 albums
Alizée albums
RCA Records albums